A coucougnette is a confection made with almonds, marzipan and chocolate. The sweet consists of a whole roasted almond coated in dark chocolate, rolled in a mix of crushed almonds, cane sugar, ginger brandy and Armagnac. Each coucougnette is dipped in raspberry juice, resulting in a pink colour. 

Coucougnettes received the award for Best French Bonbon at the Paris "Intersuc" Salon in 2000.

References  

Almond dishes
Chocolate
Confectionery